Drachenhöhle or Drachenhöhle Mixnitz (literally Dragon's Cave of Mixnitz) is a  long cave with a  wide and  high entrance near Mixnitz, Styria, Austria, south-east of Bruck an der Mur located at an elevation of  above sea level. Cave bear of the species (Ursus ingressus) and other bone fossils that people found during the Middle Ages were deemed to be the bones of dragons, a belief that culminated in the saga of the "Dragon slayer of Mixnitz".

During the fertilizer mining, several geologists and paleontologists were present, who only documented the most valuable discoveries. Nonetheless, a rich cache of cave bear, Eurasian cave lion (Panthera leo spelaea), Gray wolf (Canis lupus), Alpine ibex (Capra ibex) and Alpine marmot (Marmota marmota) fossils, remains of open hearths and Paleolithic stone tools of the Aurignacian culture dated to 65,000 to 31,000 BCE were unearthed. Dated to between 65,000 and 31,000 BCE, these rank among the oldest traces of human presence in Austria.

Excavations

Records of archaeological work were published in a monograph in 1931, that was re-edited by Othenio Abel and G. Kyrie. Excavations took place at two locations inside the cave. The around 150,000 years old sediment's strata were divided into several layers, that among those named "Prehistoric layer" and "Paleolithic fireplace" also yielded a "Neanderthal layer".

To this day the bones of more than 30,000 cave bear fossils were excavated. The site was protected in 1928 and declared a natural monument in 1949.

References

External links
 Günter Auferbauer; Luise Auferbauer (2000). Grazer Hausberge: mit Mur- und Mürztal ; 52 ausgewählte Höhenwanderungen im Grazer Bergland, im West- und Oststeirischen Randgebirge, an der Rax, in den Mürzsteger und Fischbacher Alpen, in der Hochschwabgruppe, in den Eisenerzer Alpen, in den Rottenmanner, Triebener und Seckauer Tauern sowie in den Seetaler Alpen ; [die schönsten Tal- und Höhenwanderungen]. Bergverlag Rother GmbH. pp. 34–. .
 Othenio Abel (1931). Die Drachenhöhle bei Mixnitz: Tafelband. Verlag Österr. Staatsdr.

Archaeological sites in Austria
Caves of Austria
Landforms of Styria
Graz Highlands